"Burn It Up" is a song by South Korean boy band Wanna One. It was included in their first extended play, 1X1=1 (To Be One).

Composition
Musically, "Burn It Up" is an EDM house track.

Music video
The song's accompanying music video is directed by Baik.

Critical reception
"Burn It Up" was chosen as the stand-out track of the album by Korea JoongAng Daily for its confident and ambitious lyrics and powerful hook, which complements the group's young and cheerful vibe. SBS News said that the choreography of "Burn It Up" depicts a powerful, masculine image of the members.

Charts

Weekly chart

Monthly chart

Release history

Sales

Awards and nominations

Gaon Chart Music Awards

References

External links
 
 

Korean-language songs
2017 songs
Wanna One songs